Aaron Bell may refer to:
 Aaron Bell (musician)
 Aaron Bell (politician)